The Invisible is the debut album by The Invisible, released on March 9, 2009, on Matthew Herbert's label, Accidental Records in the UK.

The album itself was released on 9 March 2009 and was produced by Matthew Herbert. London based singer Eska features as backing vocalist for all tracks apart from "In Retrograde", "London Girl" and "Spiral".

Reception

The album was nominated for the 2009 Mercury Music Prize.

The band received general praise for its first records, receiving 4 out of 5 stars from music magazines Q and Mojo.

iTunes awarded the album its 'Album of the Year' award.

Track listing
"In Retrograde" (2:41)
"Constant" (5:11)
"Passion" (3:56)
"London Girl" (4:00)
"Babydoll" (4:15)
"Monster's Waltz" (3:49)
"OK" (4:15)
"Jacob & The Angel" (4:51)
"Climate" (5:08)
"Tally of Souls" (3:16)
"Spiral" (3:26)
"Time Waits" (3:39)

References

External links
The Invisible on Accidental Records
Accidental Records

2009 debut albums
The Invisible (band) albums